A1601 may refer to:

iPad Mini 3, a tablet computer
Oppo F1s, a mobile phone